The History of Mathematical Tables: from Sumer to Spreadsheets is an edited volume in the history of mathematics on mathematical tables. It was edited by Martin Campbell-Kelly, Mary Croarken, Raymond Flood, and Eleanor Robson, developed out of the presentations at a conference on the subject organised in 2001 by the British Society for the History of Mathematics, and published in 2003 by the Oxford University Press.

Topics
An introductory chapter classifies tables broadly according to whether they are intended as aids to calculation (based on mathematical formulas) or as analyses and records of data, and further subdivides them according to how they were compiled. Following this, the contributions to the book include articles on the following topics:
Tables of data in Babylonian mathematics, administration, and astronomy, by Eleanor Robson
Early tables of logarithms, by Graham Jagger
Life tables in actuarial science, by Christopher Lewin and Margaret de Valois
The work of Gaspard de Prony constructing mathematical tables in revolutionary France, by Ivor Grattan-Guinness
Difference engines, by Michael Williams
The uses and advantages of machines in table-making, and error correction in mechanical tables, by Doron Swade
Astronomical tables, by Arthur Norberg
The data processing and statistical analyses used to produce tables of census data from punched cards, by Edward Higgs
British table-making committees, and the transition from calculators to computers, by Mary Croarken
The Mathematical Tables Project of the Works Progress Administration, in New York during the Great Depression of the 1930s and early 1940s, by David Alan Grier
The work of the British Nautical Almanac Office, by George A. Wilkins
Spreadsheets, by Martin Campbell-Kelly.
The work is presented on VIII + 361 pages in a unified format with illustrations throughout, and with the historical and biographical context of the material set aside in separate text boxes.

Audience and reception
Reviewer Paul J. Campbell finds it ironic that, unlike the works it discusses, "there are no tables in the back of the book". Reviewer Sandy L. Zabell calls the book "interesting and highly readable".

Both Peggy A. Kidwell and Fernando Q. Gouvêa note several topics that would have been worthwhile to include, including tables in mathematics in medieval Islam or other non-Western cultures, the book printing industry that provided inexpensive books of tables in the 19th century, and the development of mathematical tables in Germany. As Kidwell writes, "like most good books, this one not only tells good stories, but leaves the reader hoping to learn more".  Gouvêa evaluates the book as being useful in its coverage of a topic often missed in broader surveys of the history of mathematics, of interest both to historians of mathematics and to a more general audience interested in the development of these topics, and "a must-have for libraries".

References

External links
The History of Mathematical Tables on the Internet Archive

Mathematical tables
Books about the history of mathematics
2003 non-fiction books